Panepinto is a surname. Notable people with the surname include:

Julie Panepinto, American pediatric hematologist-oncologist and physician-scientist
Lorenzo Panepinto (1865–1911), Italian politician and teacher
Marc Panepinto, American attorney and politician
Mike Panepinto (born 1965), American football player